, sometimes credited as Poo, is a Japanese video game designer, director and producer formerly employed by Capcom. In 2004, he left Capcom to help found Crafts & Meister.

Career
Funamizu was employed by Capcom in 1985. Prior to that, he wrote for Beep as a part-time contributor until he was invited into the company by senior staff. When he joined Capcom, he befriended fellow Capcom designer Yoshiki Okamoto while playing a game of catchball. During the late 1980s and up until the mid-1990s, Funamizu designed and co-designed several of the company's arcade games, including games in the Street Fighter series (particularly Super Street Fighter II and the Street Fighter Alpha series).

Funamizu was later promoted to General Manager of Capcom's Production Studio 1 which produced several of the company's arcade and consumer titles. He, along with producer Katsuhiro Sudo left Capcom in April 2004 to form Crafts & Meister.

Works

References

External links
 Craft & Meister 

1965 births
Capcom people
Japanese video game designers
Living people
Japanese video game directors
Japanese video game producers